The Great Istanbul Tunnel is a proposed multi-use highway and railway undersea tunnel in Istanbul, Turkey to cross the Bosphorus strait.

Project
The project was officially announced by Prime minister Ahmet Davutoğlu on 27 February 2015. It will be  under the sea level. Situated between Gayrettepe on the European side and Küçüksu on the Asian side, it will integrate the highways between the three airports of the city, Istanbul Atatürk Airport, Sabiha Gökçen Airport, Istanbul Airport, and the nine rail lines of the Istanbul Metro. The cost of the project will amount to US$3.5 billion. The financing of the construction will be on the build–operate–transfer basis.

Construction
The RV Fugro Scout, a Singapore-flagged research/survey vessel of  length and  beam, started soil survey works in Bosphorus on 28 July 2017 in order to determine the exact tunnel route.

See also
 Eurasia Tunnel, undersea road tunnel, crossing the Bosphorus and connecting the Asian and European sides of Istanbul.
 Marmaray, undersea rail tunnel, crossing the Bosphorus and connecting the Asian and European sides of Istanbul.

References

Tunnels in Istanbul
Toll tunnels in Turkey
Railway tunnels in Turkey
Bosphorus crossings
Transport infrastructure under construction in Turkey
Undersea tunnels in Europe
Undersea tunnels in Asia